Golden sheen sapphire, (or goldsheen sapphire) is a variety of corundum.  Goldsheen sapphire has been tested and confirmed in lab reports as "natural sapphire" by GIA, GIT, GRS, AIGS, Tokio gem labs and Lotus. 

Goldsheen sapphire has a golden shine, almost like metal. Translucent blue, green or yellow material is sometimes present together with the gold. Particularly prominent is hematite which will often result in the formation of geometric hexagonal patterns within the gemstone crystal.

Evidence

Several articles, including the Journal of Gemmology state that gold sheen sapphire is high in iron and titanium oxide. It has inclusions of ilmenite, hematite (gold color) and magnetite (black). It exhibits asterism and hexagonal growth, a lack of UV fluorescence, healed fractures and polysynthetic twinning (parallel lines). Declared as a "new variety" in 2015, goldsheen has a stronger golden shine than other material and sometimes has blue and gold in the same stone.

Source

Previously, it was claimed in the Journal of Gemmology (JoG), that the source is a depleted mine in Kenya close to the border of Somalia. TJN Colors, GIT and In Color  also previously published that the origin was Kenya. However, GIA Tokyo  and Gems and Jewellery  stated in 2018 that the location is not known. GIA  and JoG  mention that there is no evidence of gemstone deposits in the flat border region near Somalia. Only two people are known to have acquired Goldsheen Sapphire rough stone. Tanzim Khan purchased the largest amount from an African trader, who agreed not to sell to anyone else. However, Loz Charles also met this African and purchased a smaller amount from him at a later date. The search for the secret mine goes on!

Optical effects
Gold Sheen Sapphire has a subtle effect of color change. This means that the golden surface shines strongly when the light hits it directly. It will also reflect the color of light being shined. What this means is that it will look different under cold white light as compared to more natural soft yellow light.

Heating and treatment

Golden sheen sapphire is not heated or treated. Testing of heat treatment on sample batches has resulted in diminishment of the gold sheen effect, reducing the appeal of the gemstone.

Use in jewelry

Golden sheen sapphire has been used in jewelry production by companies including:
 Audley-Charles
 William Travis Jewelry
 TVSN Australia
 David Yurman
 Cartier
 John Hardy

Awards 
In 2016 a gold sheen sapphire ring by William Travis Jewelry won the American Gem Trade Association Savor Silver Award, Men's Wear.

References

Corundum gemstones